Jedi1 (IUPAC name: 2-methyl-5-phenylfuran-3-carboxylic acid) is a chemical compound which acts as an agonist for the mechanosensitive ion channel PIEZO1, and is used in research into the function of touch perception.

See also 
 Yoda1 and Jedi2

References 

Furans
Carboxylic acids